is a Japanese actress, voice actress and narrator from Isehara. Shimazu is notable for having had voice roles in all four of the major anime television series based on the works of Rumiko Takahashi - she played Shinobu Miyake in Urusei Yatsura, Sayoko Kuroki in Maison Ikkoku, Kodachi Kuno in Ranma ½, and Abi-hime in Inuyasha. Shimazu is currently a freelancer.

Filmography

Television animation
1980
Space Warrior Baldios (Emily)
Rescueman (Nana)
Mighty Atom (Midori)

1981
Urusei Yatsura (Shinobu Miyake)
Golden Warrior Gold Lightan (Emi Takakura, Aishi Raitan)
Dr. Slump (Hiyoko)
Dokonjō Gaeru (Pato)
Muteking, The Dashing Warrior (Kiyomi)

1982
Gyakuten! Ippatsuman (Mikaduki Nana)
Sasuga no Sarutobi (Kirigia Mako)
Combat Mecha Xabungle (Rag Uralo)
Don Dracula (Chocola)
Miss Machiko (Ririi Sugishita)
Magical Princess Minky Momo (Merijien, Chimuru, Teia)

1983
Cobra (Eris)
Aura Battler Dunbine (Lana Parkinson)
Creamy Mami, the Magic Angel (Megumi Ayase)

1984
Heavy Metal L-Gaim (Oldna Poseidal, Miyama Lilin)
Bagi, the Monster of Mighty Nature (Bagi)
Persia, the Magic Fairy (Sayo Mitomo)
Lupin III (Jieni)

1985
Mobile Suit Zeta Gundam (Four Murasame)
Saber Rider and the Star Sheriffs (Annie)
Dirty Pair (Yuri)
Dancouga – Super Beast Machine God (Luna Rossa)

1986
Uchūsen Sagittarius (Henseremu)
Mobile Suit Gundam ZZ (Four Murasame, Masai Ngava)
Animated Classics of Japanese Literature (Saeko)
High School! Kimengumi (Nancy Toruneaata)
Maison Ikkoku (Sayoko Kuroki)

1987
Metal Armor Dragonar (Min)
City Hunter (Midori Oohara)
Tsuide ni Tonchinkan (Andy Jones)
Hiatari Ryōkō! (Enomoto Kyouko)

1988
Mister Ajikko (Shoukichi)

1989
Ranma ½ (Kodachi Kuno)

1990
Idol Angel Yokoso Yoko (Kumiko Yoshiaki)
Tanoshii Moomin Ikka (Raguna)
Warau Salesman (Mushi Aji Ariko)

1991
Oishinbo (Mariko Niki)

1992
Floral Magician Mary Bell (Lucy)

1993
Cooking Papa (Saeko)

1994
Magic Knight Rayearth (Narrator)

1995
El-Hazard (Miz Mishtal)
Slayers (Remi)
Sorcerer Hunters (Doctor Iiwa)

1997
Vampire Princess Miyu (Shinma Jewel-Wash)
Maze (Medusa)

1998
El-Hazard: The Alternative World (Miz Mishtal)
Sentimental Graffiti (Teacher, Opuningunareshon)
All Purpose Cultural Cat Girl Nuku Nuku (Akiko Natsume)
Detective Conan (Midori Ozaki)

1999
Shuukan!! Storyland (Manager)
Doraemon (Joouari)

2000
Shuukan!! Storyland (Yamagishi Eiko)

2003
Detective Conan (Ruri Ojou)

2004
Inuyasha (Princess Abi)

OVA
Earthian (Aya)
Urusei Yatsura OVAs (Shinobu Miyake)
Starship Troopers (Claire)
A-Ko the Versus (Chichi Raiza)
Kimagure Orange Road Pilot OVA (Madoka Ayukawa)
Spirit Warrior (Saeko)
Izumo OVA (Sanae)
Sakura Wars: Ecole de Paris  (Glycine Bleumer)
Sakura Wars: Le Nouveau Paris (Glycine Bleumer)
Heavy Metal L-Gaim (Oldna Poseidal)
El-Hazard OVA (Miz Mishtal)
El-Hazard: The Magnificent World 2 (Miz Mishtal)
Glass Mask OVA (Saeko Mizuki, Yuu's mother)
Sukeban Deka (Emi Mizuchi)
Dancouga – Super Beast Machine God OVA (Luna Rossa)
Digital Devil Story: Megami Tensei (Shirasagi Yumiko)
Dirty Pair OVAs (Yuri)
All Purpose Cultural Cat Girl Nuku Nuku OVA (Akiko Natsume)
All Purpose Cultural Cat Girl Nuku Nuku DASH! OVA (Akiko Natsume)
Mahou no Tenshi Creamy Mami: Eien no Once More (Megumi Ayase)
Ranma ½ OVA (Kodachi Kuno)
Lunn Flies into the Wind (Lunn)
Leina: Wolf Sword Legend (Emi Mizuchi)

Theatrical animation
Urusei Yatsura (film series) (Shinobu Miyake)
Crayon Shin-chan: Pursuit of the Balls of Darkness (Chimama Maho)
Kentaurosu No Densetsu (Akane)
Xabungle Graffiti (Rag Rawro)
Dirty Pair: Project Eden (Yuri)
Rescueman Movie  (Nana)
Techno Police 21C (Sukyani)
Detective Conan: Magician of the Silver Sky (Tajima Tenko)
Ranma ½: Big Trouble in Nekonron, China (Kodachi Kuno)
Lupin III: Legend of the Gold of Babylon (Lasanga)

Video games
Asuka 120% (Tetsuko Ōgigaya)
Another Century's Episode 2 (Risu Min)
Anesuto Ebansu Shirizu (Nise Oujo)
VainDream (Son)
Urusei Yatsura - Stay With You (Shinobu Miyake)
Urusei Yatsura - Dear My Friends (Shinobu Miyake)
SD Gundam G Generation (Four Murasame)
Kaiser Knuckle (Lihua)
Kaizou Chounin Shubibinman 3 (Kureha Hime)
Kensei: Sacred Fist (Kazane Tsukikage)
Kisetsu Wo Daki Shimete (Bouhoha, Esami)
Gihren no Yabou (Four Muramase)
Sakura Taisen 3 ~Pari wa Moeteiru ka~ (Glycine Bleumer)
Sakura Taisen 4 ~Koi Seyo, Otome~ (Glycine Bleumer)
Sakura Taisen Monogatari ~Mysterious Paris~ (Glycine Bleumer)
Dramatic Dungeon Sakura Taisen ~Kimi aru ga tame~ (Glycine Bleumer)
Super Robot Wars (Four Murasame, Oldna Poseidal, Rag Uralo, Min, Karen)
Tales of Destiny 2 (Fortuna)
Tokuda (Shodai Shindei)
Valis 3 (Varuna)
Langrisser (Namu)
Ranma ½ Video Game Series (Kodachi Kuno)
Rei Koku - Ikeda Kizoku Shinrei Kenkyuusho - (Denwa No Josei)

Dubbing
Fearless Hyena Part II, Hsia Ling (Lin Yin-Chu)

Awards

References

External links
Official blog 
Official website "Angel's Voice" 

1959 births
Living people
Japanese stage actresses
Japanese video game actresses
Japanese voice actresses
People from Isehara, Kanagawa
Voice actresses from Kanagawa Prefecture
20th-century Japanese actresses
21st-century Japanese actresses